Oxalis acetosella, the wood sorrel or common wood sorrel, is a rhizomatous flowering plant in the family Oxalidaceae, common in most of Europe and parts of Asia. The specific epithet acetosella refers to its sour taste. The common name wood sorrel is often used for other plants in the genus Oxalis.  In much of its range it is the only member of its genus and hence simply known as "the" wood sorrel.  While common wood sorrel may be used to differentiate it from most other species of Oxalis, in North America, Oxalis montana is also called common wood sorrel. It is also known as Alleluia because it blossoms between Easter and Pentecost, when the Psalms which end with Hallelujah are sung.

Description

It flowers from spring to midsummer with small white open-faced flowers with pink venation. Reddish or mauve flowers also occur rarely. During the night or when it rains the flowers close and the leaves fold.

As with other species of wood sorrel, the leaves are sometimes eaten by humans. An oxalate called "sal acetosella" was formerly extracted from the plant by boiling it.

Anemonoides nemorosa (wood anemone) is similar. Both have white flowers, are small, and are found in woody shady places. Anemonoides nemorosa however has palmately lobed leaves and does not have true petals but large sepals which are petal-like.

Habitat
It grows in woods and shady places in the Northern Hemisphere.

Distribution
The plant is commonly found in Great Britain and Ireland.

Note
The common wood sorrel is sometimes referred to as a shamrock and given as a gift on Saint Patrick's Day. This is due to its trifoliate clover-like leaf, and to early references to shamrock being eaten. Despite this, it is generally accepted that the plant described as "true" shamrock is a species of clover, usually lesser clover (Trifolium dubium).

References

External links

Den virtuella floran: Oxalis acetosella  
Giftpflanzen.com — Waldsauerklee 
oxalis-acetosella.com — Oxalis acetosella 

acetosella
Flora of Asia
Flora of Europe
Hardwood forest plants
Plants described in 1753
Taxa named by Carl Linnaeus
Medicinal plants
Garden plants of Asia
Garden plants of Europe
Groundcovers